Miguel Juan I. de Souza (born 11 February 1970) is an English footballer. 

He began his career as a youth player with West Ham Utd as a 14 year old, where he remained for a year before signing schoolboy forms with Brighton and Hove Albion. He was not offered a scholarship and consequently left football for a couple of years before joining Clapton FC. He progressed through the ranks at The Old Spotted Dog Ground before moving to Charlton Athletic in the first division signing professional forms for one year. He played as a right back and right midfielder. Failing to secure a first team place he joined Bristol City, where he remained on a monthly contract for several months before signing for Conference side Yeovil Town. After 18 months he returned to London and joined Dagenham & Redbridge, where reserve-team manager Ted Hardy converted him to a striker. A year season later de Souza broke into the first team scoring 15 goals before being signed by Barry Fry for then First Division (second-tier) club Birmingham City. He played as a right-sided midfielder, occasionally playing as a striker in the first team. He had successful spells at both Wycombe Wanderers and Peterborough United, before joining two other Conference outfits Rushden & Diamonds and Boston United. He was appointed player/coach of St Albans City in May 2004.

He joined Leyton Orient's youth setup in 2009, coaching the under-16s for four years and then taking on the role of academy head of recruitment. He now works at Charlton Athletic as academy recruitment manager.

References
General

Rothmans Football Yearbook 2000-2001
Specific

1970 births
Living people
People from the London Borough of Newham
English footballers
Association football forwards
Brighton & Hove Albion F.C. players
East Ham United F.C. players
Clapton F.C. players
Charlton Athletic F.C. players
Bristol City F.C. players
Yeovil Town F.C. players
Dorchester Town F.C. players
Bashley F.C. players
Dagenham & Redbridge F.C. players
Birmingham City F.C. players
Bury F.C. players
Wycombe Wanderers F.C. players
Peterborough United F.C. players
Southend United F.C. players
Rochdale A.F.C. players
Rushden & Diamonds F.C. players
Boston United F.C. players
Farnborough F.C. players
St Albans City F.C. players
Boreham Wood F.C. players
Dulwich Hamlet F.C. players
Wealdstone F.C. players
English Football League players
Charlton Athletic F.C. non-playing staff
Leyton Orient F.C. non-playing staff
Association football coaches